This is the filmography of Jeetendra, the Indian Bollywood film actor; and films and TV serial producer. He has acted in Hindi films as the lead hero around 200 times. He also holds more than 121 box office hits in his six decade long film career.

1960 – 1970

1971 – 1975

1976 – 1980

1981 – 1985

1986 – 1990

1991 – 1995

1996 – present

References

External links 
Jeetendra filmography on IMDb

Indian filmographies
Male actor filmographies